Milano–Torino is a semi classic European single day cycling race, between the northern Italian cities of Milan and Turin over a distance of 199 kilometres. The event was first run in 1876 making it the oldest  classic race in the world. The event is owned by the RCS media group which owns the Italian sports daily La Gazzetta dello Sport. RCS also organises other top Italian cycling events such as the Giro d'Italia, Milan–San Remo and Tirreno–Adriatico. The race is ranked UCI ProSeries on the UCI continental calendar. The race was not run between the spring of 2007 and the autumn of 2012.

Race dates
The position of the race in the European calendar has changed several times. Prior to 1987 the event was always seven days before Milan–San Remo and was seen as an important preparation race for the Spring Classics, however in 1987 Milano–Torino was switched to a date in October just before the Giro di Lombardia because the race organisers were not happy with the inclement weather conditions characterised by early March in northern Italy. In October the race became part of the "Trittico di Autunno" (Autumn Treble) along with the Giro del Piemonte and the Giro di Lombardia which were all run in the same week. In 2005 Milan–Torino returned to its traditional date in early March, however the 2008 edition again returned to a date in October exchanging dates with the Monte Paschi Eroica race which is now run in March. However the race did not take place in October 2008 and it was not run for the next four years until an agreement was reached in February 2012 between the race owners (RCS) and the Associazione Ciclistica Arona to organise the race for the next three years.

The 2000 edition of the race was not held because of torrential rain which caused catastrophic mud slides in the Piedmont area.

The route
The race starts in Novate Milanese, just north west of  Milan, and crosses the Ticino river at Vigevano after 40 kilometres, leaving the region of Lombardy and entering Piedmont. The first 95 kilometres of the race are run in a south westerly direction on broad flat roads, the climb of Vignale Monferrato (293 metres) is encountered and then a series of small undulations take the race to Asti after 130 kilometres. The race route crosses four railway level crossings at 70, 75, 129 and 133 kilometres and these can be important in helping any breakaways if the peloton is held up by a train. At Asti the race swings north westerly towards Turin climbing steadily before tackling the tough climb of the Superga Hill (620 metres) just 16 kilometres from the finish. The Superga climb is often the springboard for a group of riders to escape before the finish. From the top of the Superga it is a fast picturesque descent into Turin down the Strada Panoramica dei Colli through the Parco Naturale della Collina di Superga to finish in the Fausto Coppi velodrome on Corso Casale in Turin.

In the 2012 and 2021 edition the finish was moved to the top of Superga (repeated two times).

The 2020 edition was a flat race for the sprinters.

Significant winners
Milano–Torino is one of the fastest of the classics, Walter Martin won the 1961 edition at an average speed of 45.094 kilometres per hour and this stood for a time as the fastest speed in a classic race until beaten by Marinio Vigna in the 1964 edition of the Tre Valli Varesine. Swiss rider Markus Zberg now holds the record average speed for the race when he won in 1999 at a speed of 45.75 kilometres per hour. The record for the most wins in Milano–Torino stands to the Italian Costante Girardengo who took five victories between 1914 and 1923. Pierino Favalli took a hat trick of wins between 1938 and 1940. Tour de France and Giro d'Italia winner, the late Marco Pantani almost died in the 1995 edition of Milano–Torino when police allowed a four-wheel drive vehicle onto the course by mistake; Pantani and two other riders ploughed into the vehicle. Pantani sustained multiple leg breaks and missed the entire 1996 season. In 2012 the winner was Alberto Contador, who won the first single day race in his pro career.

Races

During the first race in 1876, there were only 10 competitors, however, there were an estimated 10,000 spectators.

Winners

References

External links

 

 
Cycle races in Italy
UCI Europe Tour races
Recurring sporting events established in 1876
1876 establishments in Italy
Super Prestige Pernod races